The Weapon is a 2023 American action thriller film directed by Tony Schiena and starring Schiena, AnnaLynne McCord, Sean Patrick Flanery, Jack Kesy, Cuba Gooding Jr. and Bruce Dern.

Cast
Tony Schiena as Dallas Ultio
AnnaLynne McCord as Iris
Sean Patrick Flanery as U.S. Marshall Antano
Jack Kesy as Vinny
Cuba Gooding Jr. as Blue
Bruce Dern as Doris

Release
The film was released in select theaters, on demand and digital platforms on February 17, 2023.  It will also be released on DVD on March 28, 2023.

Reception
Jeffrey Anderson of Common Sense Media awarded the film one star out of five.

References

External links